This article lists the Social Democratic Federation's election results in UK parliamentary elections. It also includes the results of its successor, the British Socialist Party.

Summary of general election performance

Elections results

1885 general election

1892 general election

By-elections, 1892–1895

1895 general election

By-elections, 1895–1900

1900 general election

For the 1900 general election, the Social Democratic Federation stood candidates as part of the Labour Representation Committee.

By-elections, 1900–1906

1906 general election

By-elections, 1906–1910

January 1910 general election

December 1910 general election

By-elections, 1910–1918

The Social Democratic Party merged into the British Socialist Party in 1911.  Hartley was endorsed by the Labour Party.

1918 general election

All candidates other than Arnall, Hirst and Murray stood for the Labour Party.  Hirst stood for the Co-operative Party.

References

 Martin Crick, The History of the Social Democratic Federation, pp.330-332

British Socialist Party
Social Democratic Federation
Election results by party in the United Kingdom